Comarapa is a small town in Bolivia. In 2009 it had an estimated population of 5,793. It is located roughly halfway between Cochabamba and Santa Cruz.

References

Populated places in Santa Cruz Department (Bolivia)